The 2015 Super Rugby season was the 20th season of Super Rugby and the fifth season featuring an expanded 15-team format. For sponsorship reasons, this competition was known as Asteron Life Super Rugby in Australia, Investec Super Rugby in New Zealand and Vodacom Super Rugby in South Africa. The round-robin matches took place every weekend from 13 February until 13 June, followed by the finals series and culminating in the final on 4 July. This was the final season that featured a 15-team format.

Competition format

Covering 21 weeks, the schedule featured a total of 125 matches. The 15 teams were grouped geographically, labelled the Australian Conference, New Zealand Conference and the South African Conference. The regular season consisted of two types of matches:
 Internal Conference Matches – Each team played the other four teams in the same conference twice, home and away.
 Cross Conference Matches – Each team played four teams of the other two conferences away, and four teams of the other two conferences home, thus missing out on two teams (one from each of the other conferences). Each team played two home and two away games against teams from each of the other conferences, making a total of eight cross conference games for each team.

The top team of each conference, plus the next top three teams in table points regardless of conference (wild card teams), moved on to the finals. The top two conference winners, based on table points, received byes in the qualifier round. In the qualifier round, the third conference winner was the number three seed and hosted the wild card team with the worst record, and the best wild card team hosted the second-best wild card team. In the semi-finals, the number two conference winner hosted the higher surviving seed from the first round, and the number one conference winner hosted the other first-round winner. The final was hosted by the top remaining seed.

Standings

Round-by-round

The table below shows each team's progression throughout the season. For each round, their cumulative points total is shown with the overall log position in brackets:

Matches

The following matches were played during the 2015 Super Rugby regular season:

Round 1

Round 2

Round 3

Round 4

Round 5

Round 6

Round 7

Round 8

Round 9

Round 10

Round 11

Round 12

Round 13

Round 14

Round 15

Round 16

Round 17

Round 18

Finals

Qualifiers

Semi-finals

Final

Players

Player statistics

The following table contain points which were scored in the 2015 Super Rugby season:

Referees

The following refereeing panel was appointed by SANZAR for the 2015 Super Rugby season:

Attendances

References

External links
 Super Rugby websites:
SANZAR Super Rugby
Australia Super Rugby
New Zealand Super Rugby

 SuperXV.com

 
2015
 
 
 
2015 rugby union tournaments for clubs